Naim Dhifallah (born April 12, 1982) is a Tunisian basketball player currently playing for Club Africain after playing for Egypt Assurance in the Egyptian Basketball League and Club Africain for the first six years of his career.

Dhifallah is a member of the Tunisia national basketball team that finished third at the 2009 FIBA Africa Championship to qualify for the country's first FIBA World Championship.  Dhifallah averaged eight points per game for the Tunisians during the tournament including a team-leading 13 points in an opening loss to Cape Verde.  He has also competed for the Tunisians in the 2005 and 2007 FIBA Africa Championship.

References

Tunisian men's basketball players
1982 births
Living people
Club Africain basketball players
Power forwards (basketball)
Small forwards
2010 FIBA World Championship players
20th-century Tunisian people
21st-century Tunisian people